Western Necropolis is a cemetery complex in Glasgow, Scotland located to the north of the city centre. As well as the actual Western Necropolis cemetery established in 1882, it is bordered by Lambhill Cemetery which opened in 1881, St Kentigern's Cemetery (Roman Catholic) that opened in 1882, and Glasgow (Garnethill) Hebrew Burial Ground founded in 1989.

Of the four necropolises in Glasgow, the Western Necropolis is the only one with a crematorium on the grounds. Designed by James Chalmers in 1893 and opened in 1895, it was the first crematorium in Scotland.

The cemetery contains 359 Commonwealth war graves from the First and 124 from Second World Wars, beside others from the Second Boer War.

Notable burials in Western Necropolis

 David Barclay (1846–1917) – architect
 Hugh Barclay (1829–1892) – architect
 James Thomson Bottomley (1845–1926) – physicist
 James Bridie (1888–1951) – playwright/screenwriter/physician
 John Burnet (1814–1901) – architect
 James Finlayson (1840–1906) – surgeon
 Henry MacDonald (1823–1893) – British Army officer, V.C. recipient
 Alexander Beith McDonald (1847–1915) – architect
 William Shirreffs (1846–1902) – sculptor
 William Alexander Smith (1854–1914) – Boy's Bridge founder
 Alexander Neill Somerville (1813–1889) – minister/evangelist
 Four unidentified victims of the 1915 Quintinshill rail disaster

Notable burials in Lambhill Cemetery
 Will Fyffe (1885–1947) – actor/singer
 James Sellars (1843–1888) – architect
 Findlay Weir (1889–1918) – footballer, died while serving in World War I

Notable burials at St Kentigern’s Cemetery
 Robert Downie (1894–1968) – British Army soldier, V.C. recipient
 Francis Fitzpatrick (1859–1933) – British Army soldier, V.C. recipient
 Benny Lynch (1913–1946) – boxer

Notable cremations at Glasgow Crematorium
 Major-General Sir Robert Bellew Adams (1856–1928) – British Army officer, V.C. recipient (ashes buried at Inverness)
 Guy Aldred (1886–1963) – English anarchist-communist (following leaving of his body to medical science).
 Keir Hardie (1856–1915) – founder Labour Party Leader
 James Maxton (1885–1946) – Independent Labour Party leader and local M.P.
 Jessie M. Soga (1870–1954) – singer/teacher/suffragette

A memorial in the garden of rest erected by the Commonwealth War Graves Commission commemorates one serviceman of World War I and 72 Commonwealth service personnel of World War II who were cremated here.

References

Cemeteries in Scotland
Buildings and structures in Glasgow
Inventory of Gardens and Designed Landscapes
Commonwealth War Graves Commission cemeteries in Scotland
1882 establishments in Scotland